The 1962 Invercargill mayoral election was part of the New Zealand local elections held that same year. The polling was conducted using the standard first-past-the-post electoral method. Three-term deputy mayor Neil Watson was elected mayor, defeating former Legislative Council member and parliamentary candidate Thomas Francis Doyle.

Results
The following table gives the election results:

References

1962 elections in New Zealand
Mayoral elections in Invercargill
October 1962 events in New Zealand